Diego Castillo may refer to:
 Diego Castillo (swimmer) (born 1991), Panamanian swimmer
 Diego Castillo (pitcher) (born 1994), Dominican baseball pitcher
 Diego Castillo (infielder) (born 1997), Venezuelan baseball infielder 
 Diego Castillo (badminton) (born 2001), Chilean badminton player